Beta-Ala-His dipeptidase is an enzyme that in humans is encoded by the CNDP1 gene.

This gene encodes a member of the M20 metalloprotease family. The encoded protein is specifically expressed in the brain, is a homodimeric dipeptidase which was identified as human carnosinase. This gene contains trinucleotide (CTG) repeat length polymorphism in the coding region.

The metabolic disorder Carnosinemia may be caused by mutations in this gene.

References

Further reading

External links